Alaska is a state of the United States in the northwest extremity of the North American continent. According to the 2020 United States Census, Alaska is the 3rd least populous state with 733,391 inhabitants but is the largest by land area spanning . Alaska is divided administratively into 19 organized boroughs and one Unorganized Borough (which is divided into 11 non-administrative census areas) and contains 149 incorporated cities: four unified home rule municipalities, which are considered both boroughs and cities; ten home rule cities; nineteen first class cities; and 116 second class cities. Only two other cities have an incorporated area exceeding : Unalaska, which includes the fishing port of Dutch Harbor, and Valdez, which includes the terminus of the Trans-Alaska Pipeline System.

Incorporated cities in Alaska are categorized as either "general law" (subdivided into "first class" and "second class") or "home rule".  In general, the powers and functions of general law cities and home rule cities are substantially the same, with all legislative powers not prohibited by law or charter. Apart from duties such as conducting elections and holding regular meetings of the governing bodies, the duties of local cities vary considerably and are determined at the local level. Home rule cities and first class cities in the unorganized borough must operate municipal school districts, exercise planning, and land use regulations while organized boroughs take on these responsibilities unless delegated to the city by the borough. Unified home rule cities (and other boroughs) also have the duty to collect municipal property and sales tax for use in their jurisdiction. Home rule cities occur when a community establishes a commission to draft a charter, which is then ratified by voters at an election. Title 29 of the Alaska Statutes, which covers municipal government, requires that a community must have at least 400 permanent residents to incorporate as a home rule or first class city.  This status does not diminish if a city's population declines; one home rule city (Nenana) and four first class cities (Hydaburg, Pelican, Seldovia and Tanana) reported populations falling below that threshold in the 2010 Census.

The smallest municipality by population is Kupreanof with 21 residents. The first city to incorporate was Ketchikan in 1901 and the newest municipality is Whale Pass which incorporated in 2017.

Incorporated cities

Notes

See also
 List of census-designated places in Alaska
 List of boroughs and census areas in Alaska

References

Alaska
Alaska
Cities